"Innocent Starter" is the tenth single by Japanese singer Nana Mizuki. The title track was the opening theme for the anime Magical Girl Lyrical Nanoha. It reached number 9 on the Japanese Oricon charts.

Track listing
Innocent Starter
Lyrics: Nana Mizuki
Composition, arrangement: Tsutomu Ohira
Opening theme for anime television series Magical Girl Lyrical Nanoha
Featured in Nana Mizuki's album Alive & Kicking and her greatest hits The Museum
Open Your Heart
Lyrics: Nana Mizuki
Composition, arrangement: Takahiro Iida

Lyrics, composition: Chiyomaru Shikura
Arrangement: Tsutomu Ohira
New version of opening theme for PS2 game Memories Off: Sorekara
Innocent Starter (Off Vocal Version)
Open Your Heart (Off Vocal Version)
Soredemo kimi o omoidesu kara -again- (Off Vocal Version)

Charts

External links
CDJapan

Nana Mizuki songs
2004 singles
Songs written by Nana Mizuki
2004 songs
King Records (Japan) singles